Bruno Schmitz (21 November 1858 – 27 April 1916) was a German architect best known for his monuments in the early 20th century. He worked closely with sculptors such as Emil Hundrieser, Nikolaus Geiger and Franz Metzner for integrated architectural and sculptural effect.

Schmitz was born in Düsseldorf. His single most famous work is the massive 1913 Völkerschlachtdenkmal (Monument to the Battle of the Nations) located in Leipzig, Saxony, designed with local architect Clemens Thieme.  The Monument was inaugurated in 1913 by Kaiser Wilhelm II.  Bohemian sculptor Franz Metzner designed the architectural figures, including the powerful and strangely scaled Masks of Fate in the monument's crypt.

Along with the Leipzig monument, Schmitz designed the Kyffhäuser Monument and the Kaiser Wilhelm Monument at Porta Westfalica, bringing him the distinction of designing the three largest war monuments in Germany.  All of them are rough, primitive masonry structures in a style that blends Romanesque precedents with modernist touches, and all of them are associated with German nationalism in the period before World War I.

Schmitz's daughter Angelica Schmitz (1893–1957) was the wife of the Ukrainian-American sculptor Alexander Archipenko.

Selected works

Geschäftshaus (commercial building) (1883), Düsseldorf.
Kyffhäuser Monument (1889–96), Porta Westfalica, with Emil Hundrieser and Nikolaus Geiger, sculptors.
Kaiser Wilhelm Monument (1890–96), Teutoburg Forest, Porta Westfalica, with Caspar von Zumbusch, sculptor.
Deutsches Eck Monument (1894–97), Koblenz, with Emil Hundrieser, sculptor.
Kaiserin Augusta Monument (1896), Koblenz, with Karl Friedrich Moest, sculptor.
Völkerschlachtdenkmal (Monument to the Battle of the Nations) (1898–1913), Leipzig, with Clemens Thieme, architect, and Franz Metzner, sculptor.
Bismarckturm (Bismark Tower) (1899–1900), Unna.
Villa Stockwerk (1899–1902), Cologne.
Mannheimer Rosengarten (1899–1903), Friedrichsplatz, Mannheim.
Kaiser Wilhelm Monument (1901), Halle.
Automat Commercial Building (1904–05), Berlin.
Weinhaus Rheingold (Rheingold Wine House) (1905–06), Berlin (destroyed).
Carl Hoffman Tomb, Old St. Matthew's Church, Berlin, with Nikolaus Geiger, sculptor.
A number of the Bismarck towers.

United States
Indiana Soldiers and Sailors' Monument (1888–1902), Monument Circle, Indianapolis, Indiana. 
German Pavilion (1904), Saint Louis World's Fair, Saint Louis, Missouri.

References

External links 

On Schmitz's Bismarck Towers, in German

1858 births
1916 deaths
People from Düsseldorf
Architects from North Rhine-Westphalia
People from the Rhine Province